Kongsberg Maritime (KM) is a Norwegian technology enterprise within the Kongsberg Gruppen (KOG). Kongsberg Maritime deliver systems for positioning, surveying, navigation, and automation to merchant vessels and offshore installations. Their most well known products exist within dynamic positioning systems, marine automation and surveillance systems, process automation, satellite navigation, and hydroacoustics.

History 

Kongsberg Maritime's history dates back to 1946. Simonsen Radio, later Simrad was founded 31. December that year. The first product was a radio telephone for the fishing fleet. The first echo sounder for the commercial fishing fleet came on the market in 1950. The first alarm system was ready in 1959. Kongsberg Maritime has over the years absorbed a number of well known maritime and offshore related companies, including:

 Autronica
 Consultas
 Contros 
 Embient
 GeoAcoustics
 KonMap
 Kongsberg Mesotech
 NorControl
 Rolls-Royce Commercial Marine
 Seatex
 Simrad
The parent company Kongsberg Gruppen was established on March 20, 1814 as Kongsberg Vaabenfabrik (KV) (lit.: "Kongsberg Weapons Factory") and in 2014 they celebrated 200 years in business.

Products 
The main product areas for Kongsberg Maritime are:
Deck systems Includes complete seismic back-deck systems, seismic cable control, marine and offshore cranes and helideck monitoring.
Dynamic positioning systems Control systems that make it possible to keep a vessel/platform in the same position under demanding weather conditions.
Navigation systems Radar, digital chart systems (ECDIS), steering systems and integrated  navigation equipment for ship's bridges.
Hydroacoustics, echo sounder, sonars High technology hydroacoustic products for seabed surveying, subsea communication and positioning.
Autonomous underwater vehicles & marine robotic systems Free-swimming autonomous underwater vehicles characterized by great manoeuvrability and high accuracy for civilian and military use including the HUGIN Family of AUVs (HUGIN, HUGIN Egde, HUGIN Superior and HUGIN Endurance). Other marine robotic systems include the Sounder autonomous Uncrewed Surface Vessel (USV) for scientific and survey tasks, and Eelume, a free swimming resident robot for subsea inspection and observation operations. 
Marine automation and surveillance systems Systems for surveillance and for controlling engines, cargo and propulsion on vessels.
Motion sensors, GPS, AIS and position reference systems Automatic systems for recording vessel identification, position, movement and cargo (AIS - Automatic Identification Systems). GPS satellite positioning systems.
Naval systems Acoustic monitoring and tracking systems, homeland security systems, naval sonars transponders and pingers.
Sensors and transmitters Sensors to measure temperature, pressure, tank level, motion and dissolved gases.
Tank gauging Systems to measure, monitor and control liquid cargos.
Underwater and harsh environment camera systems Underwater cameras, imaging technology and products to the Offshore Oilfield, Scientific, Maritime and Naval sectors.

References

External links
 Kongsberg Maritime official homepage
 Kongsberg Gruppen official homepage - Parent company
 Simrad official homepage - Subsidiary

Diver-detector sonars
Electronics companies of Norway
Manufacturing companies of Norway
Defence companies of Norway
Navigation system companies
Radar
Underwater security
Maritime